Ernie Watson (7 September 1908 – 5 May 1982) was an Australian rules footballer who played with Essendon in the Victorian Football League (VFL).

Notes

External links 

1908 births
1982 deaths
Australian rules footballers from Victoria (Australia)
Essendon Football Club players